The 2023 Southland Conference men's basketball tournament was the postseason men's basketball tournament for the 2022–23 season of the Southland Conference. The tournament was held March 5–8, 2023, at The Legacy Center in Lake Charles, Louisiana. The tournament winner will receive the conference's automatic invitation to the 2023 NCAA Division I men's basketball tournament.

McNeese clinched the final berth in the tournament on the final day of the regular season by overcoming a 22-point second-half deficit to earn 79–78 dramatic comeback victory over New Orleans. The McNeese win eliminated Incarnate Word, which controlled its own destiny but lost, 81–64, to Northwestern State.

Seeds 
Teams were seeded by record within the conference, with a tie–breaker system to seed teams with identical conference records. The top two seeds received double byes into the semifinals in the merit-based format. The No. 3 and No. 4 seeds received single byes to the quarterfinals. Tiebreakers used are, in general, 1) Head-to-head results, 2) comparison of records against individual teams in the conference starting with the top-ranked team(s) and working down, 3) road record in conference games,  4) comparison of road records against individual teams in the conference starting with the top-ranked team(s) and working down and 5) NCAA NET rankings available on day following the conclusion of regular-season play.

If a team that is not eligible for the NCAA Tournament wins the Southland Conference Tournament, the conference's automatic bid goes to the regular-season champion.

Schedule

Bracket

* denotes number of overtime periods

See also
2023 Southland Conference women's basketball tournament
Southland Conference men's basketball tournament

References 

Tournament
Southland Conference men's basketball tournament
Southland Conference men's basketball tournament
Southland Conference men's basketball tournament
Sports in Lake Charles, Louisiana
Basketball competitions in Louisiana
College basketball tournaments in Louisiana